Ramiro Martins (born 25 September 1941) is a former Portuguese cyclist. He competed in the individual road race and team time trial events at the 1960 Summer Olympics.

References

External links
 

1941 births
Living people
Portuguese male cyclists
Olympic cyclists of Portugal
Cyclists at the 1960 Summer Olympics